Olexandr Bortnyk (born 18 October 1996) is a Ukrainian chess player. He was awarded the title Grandmaster by FIDE in 2015, at the age of 19. A former chess prodigy, Bortnyk is considered one of the strongest players according to his rating on the chess.com website in the "Blitz" and "Bullet" category.  In 2018, Oleksandr left for the USA together with his wife Evgenia Bortnyk and founded the "Bortnik School of Chess" chess school. Oleksandr Bortnyk has an older brother, Mykola Bortnyk, who also plays chess and holds the title International Master.
He regularly streams on Twitch and puts up content on YouTube

Early Years
He was born in the village of Oleksandrivka, Voznesensky district, Mykolaiv region. He started playing chess at the age of 3. In 2001, five-year-old Bortnyk took part in competitions for the first time. Since 2002, he studied under the guidance of coach Roman Khayetskyi. After graduating from Oleksandrivska secondary school, he entered Admiral Makarov National Shipbuilding University.

Chess Career
Bortnyk has won multiple Ukrainian and European youth tournaments as well as many chess.com and lichess.org online events.

2003-2012 
He had impressive results in Ukrainian/European Youth Championships(U8, U12, U14, U16) during this period.

2013 
 Silver medalist of the World Championship U18 (Al-Ain, UAE)
 Champion of Ukraine U20 (Rapid chess)
 Champion of Ukraine U20 (Blitz)
 1st place — Dvorkovich Cup

2014 
In 2014, Bortnyk won the World Youth Chess Championships in the U18 category held in Durban, South Africa.

2016 
Bronshtein Memorial (Minsk) — 2nd place.

2019 
He reached the final of the Chess.com Bullet Chess championship but then lost to the winner Hikaru Nakamura.

2023 
In January 2023, Bortnyk tied for first place with GM Razvan Preotu at the Charlotte Open, claiming the title on tiebreaks.

References

External links
 
 
 
 
 
 

1996 births
Living people
Chess grandmasters
Ukrainian chess players
World Youth Chess Champions
People from Oleksandrivka, Mykolaiv Oblast